Indumati Gopinathan (born 23 March 1956) is a noted Indian pathologist. She specializes in diagnostic medicine, ocular oncopathology and gynecological histopathology.

Medical career
Gopinathan completed her undergraduate and post graduation degree (M.D.) in Pathology from Seth Gordhandas Sunderdas Medical College and King Edward Memorial Hospital. She is a leading commentator on Telepathology. She was also associated with Space Hospitals, a Chennai-based telemedicine company. She is the health consultant/columnist for The Times of India, the world's largest selling English newspaper. Indumati Gopinathan is on the editorial board of HealthScreen, an Indian health care magazine focusing on preventive medicine, and a columnist for Health Care Express, a leading weekly healthcare publication by the Indian Express group.

Indumati Gopinathan is director on the board of directors at Thyrocare Healthcare.

She currently resides and is in private practice in Chembur, Mumbai, India.

References

Living people
Indian pathologists
1956 births
Medical doctors from Mumbai
Indian women medical doctors
20th-century Indian medical doctors
Indian women medical researchers
20th-century Indian women scientists
Indian medical researchers
Women scientists from Maharashtra
20th-century women physicians